was a renowned Japanese photographer.

References

Japanese photographers
1907 births
1995 deaths